Pseudodellamora championi is a beetle in the genus Pseudodellamora of the family Mordellidae. It was described in 1899 by Schilsky.

References

Mordellidae
Beetles described in 1899